Thomas Persson (Bengt Thomas Persson) (born 14 February 1947 in Helsingborg, Sweden) is a former Swedish handball player who competed in the 1972 Summer Olympics held in Munich, Germany.

In 1972 he was part of the Swedish team which finished seventh in the Olympic tournament. He played four matches and scored six goals.

References

1947 births
Living people
Swedish male handball players
Olympic handball players of Sweden
Handball players at the 1972 Summer Olympics
IFK Kristianstad players